Dixon Stiven Rentería Mosquera (born 24 September 1995) is a Colombian professional footballer who plays as a centre-back for Atlético Huila, on loan from Santa Fe.

Career
Rentería joined Santa Fe's ranks in 2014. In 2015, the centre-back was loaned to Expreso Rojo. He made his senior debut in a home defeat to Deportes Quindío on 28 February in Categoría Primera B. Rentería scored his first career goal on 3 May during a 5–1 away loss to Deportivo Pereira, which preceded him netting a brace in a Copa Colombia group stage encounter on home soil with Bogotá on 6 May. Another goal arrived on 21 May away against América de Cali. He made thirty appearances in total for Expreso Rojo. Rentería returned to Santa Fe at the end of 2015, though would immediately leave on loan again.

Ahead of January 2016, Rentería completed a loan move back to Categoría Primera B with Llaneros. Goals followed against Deportes Quindío and Orsomarso across twenty-two matches in league and cup. 2017 saw Rentería pen temporary terms with Unión Magdalena. He remained for both 2017 and 2018 to score twice in each campaign, doing so for the fourth year in a row; he was also sent off three times in that period, having received a red card once each whilst with Expreso Rojo and Llaneros. Unión Magdalena won promotion at the end of 2018, as he then featured five times in Categoría Primera A for them.

Rentería went back to Santa Fe midway through 2019, as he made his debut for the club on 11 August in a goalless draw at home to Patriotas. His first goal for El Cardenal came on 9 March 2020 versus Atlético Nacional. On 1 February 2021, Rentería headed abroad as he was loaned to Argentina with Primera División side Central Córdoba. He debuted in a Copa de la Liga Profesional win away to Atlético Tucumán on 22 February.

At the end of December 2021, Rentería joined Atlético Huila.

Style of play
Rentería is primarily a centre-back, though he did play as a centre-forward for Expreso Rojo and as a right-back for Llaneros.

Career statistics
.

Notes

References

External links

1995 births
Living people
People from El Retorno
Colombian footballers
Association football defenders
Colombian expatriate footballers
Expatriate footballers in Argentina
Colombian expatriate sportspeople in Argentina
Categoría Primera B players
Categoría Primera A players
Argentine Primera División players
Independiente Santa Fe footballers
Tigres F.C. footballers
Llaneros F.C. players
Unión Magdalena footballers
Central Córdoba de Santiago del Estero footballers
Atlético Huila footballers